|}

The World Trophy is a Group 3 flat horse race in Great Britain open to horses aged three years or older. It is run at Newbury over a distance of 5 furlongs and 34 yards (1,037 metres), and it is scheduled to take place each year in September.

History
The event was formerly called the Marlborough Stakes, and it used to be an ungraded conditions race for three-year-olds. It was renamed in memory of Tony Stratton-Smith, a racehorse-owning music entrepreneur, in 1992. The Tony Stratton-Smith Memorial Stakes was opened to older horses in 1993.

The race became known as the World Trophy when Dubai Airport started a new period of sponsorship in 1997. From this point the event held Listed status, and it was promoted to Group 3 level in 2002.

Records

Most successful horse (2 wins):
 Eveningperformance – 1994, 1997
 The Tatling – 2004, 2005

Leading jockey since 1980 (5 wins):
 Pat Eddery – Fine Edge (1983), Moorestyle Girl (1987), Young Hal (1988), Cathedral (1998), Imperial Beauty (1999)

Leading trainer since 1980 (2 wins):
 Henry Candy – Eveningperformance (1994, 1997)
 Milton Bradley – The Tatling (2004, 2005)
 Roger Varian -  Cotai Glory (2016), Mitbaahy (2022)

Winners since 1980

See also
 Horse racing in Great Britain
 List of British flat horse races

References
 Paris-Turf: 
 Racing Post:
 galopp-sieger.de – World Trophy.
 horseracingintfed.com – International Federation of Horseracing Authorities – World Trophy (2018).
 pedigreequery.com – World Trophy – Newbury.

Flat races in Great Britain
Newbury Racecourse
Open sprint category horse races